Kardan investment bank (Shirkat-e Tamin-e Sirmayeh-e Kardan) is a full-fledged investment bank based in Tehran, Iran. Kardan is licensed and regulated by the country’s Securities and Exchange Organization (SEO).
The formation of Kardan Investment Bank started in January 2011. The Bank received its license from SEO in June 2013. The company’s capital initially set at IRR1 Trillion ($40 million) was raised to IRR2 Trillion (about $80 million) when license was granted. 
The company is poised to execute cross-border deals  and is sponsored and owned by three commercial banks, Tejarat (the country’s third largest bank), Saman and Middle East. 
Kardan board of directors is chaired by Wisconsin university graduate and a prominent banker  Dr. Parviz Aghili (Chairman) who spearheaded the creation of the company. The company is co-founded by Majid Zamani and run by Yousef A. Sharifi (CEO) a Connecticut University graduate and a previous investment manager to the Saman Bank.

Corporate governance
 Ehsan Moradi - CEO

References

External links

Banks of Iran
Banks established in 2014
Iranian companies established in 2014